Hieronala is a moth genus in the family Autostichidae. It contains the species Hieronala huri, which is found in Afghanistan.

References

Symmocinae